Pavla Klicnarová (born 2 January 1988 in Náchod) is a Czech alpine ski racer.

References

1988 births
Living people
Czech female alpine skiers
People from Náchod
Universiade silver medalists for the Czech Republic
Universiade medalists in alpine skiing
Competitors at the 2015 Winter Universiade
Sportspeople from the Hradec Králové Region